The position of Under-Secretary of State for Commonwealth Affairs in the United Kingdom was created in 1966 by the merger of the old positions of Under-Secretary of State for Commonwealth Relations and Under-Secretary of State for the Colonies. The position dealt with British relations with members of the Commonwealth of Nations. In 1968 the position was merged with the Under-Secretary of State for Foreign Affairs to create the new position of Under-Secretary of State for Foreign and Commonwealth Affairs.

Office Holders
1966: Lord Beswick
1967: William Whitlock

Lists of government ministers of the United Kingdom
History of the Commonwealth of Nations
Defunct ministerial offices in the United Kingdom